(1888–March 15, 1959) was a Japanese diplomat. He served as Chargé d'affaires ad interim at the Japanese Embassy in Germany in 1932–1933, and later also in London. Also served as Japanese Ambassador to Czechoslovakia in 1937–1939.

His grandfather is Hirobumi Ito, the first prime minister of Japan. Ichiro Fujisaki, Japanese Ambassador to the United States from 2008, is grandson of Fujii.

See also
 List of ambassadors of Japan to Czechoslovakia and the Czech Republic
 List of Japanese ministers, envoys and ambassadors to Germany

References

Further reading
 Heinz Eberhard Maul, Japan und die Juden: Studie über die Judenpolitik des Kaiserreiches Japan während der Zeit des Nationalsozialismus 1933 – 1945 (Dissertation submitted to Rheinischen Friedrich-Wilhelms University in Bonn, mentioning Fujii) 

Ambassadors of Japan to Czechoslovakia
1888 births
1959 deaths
Japanese expatriates in Germany
Japanese expatriates in the United Kingdom